Erik Johansen (born 3 September 1928) was a Danish sailor. He competed in the 5.5 Metre event at the 1968 Summer Olympics.

References

External links
 

1928 births
Possibly living people
Danish male sailors (sport)
Olympic sailors of Denmark
Sailors at the 1968 Summer Olympics – 5.5 Metre
Sportspeople from Copenhagen